Grays Flat (often "Grays Flats", or "Grey Flats") is an unincorporated community in Marion County, West Virginia, United States. It lies along the Paw Paw Creek, adjacent on the northeast of Grant Town.

External links
Map of Grays Flat
Link to West Virginia Goldenseal Magazine article including Grays Flat
West Virginia Place Names Listing

References 

Unincorporated communities in Marion County, West Virginia
Unincorporated communities in West Virginia